Ernst Lucht (27 February 1896 – 2 November 1975) was a German admiral during World War II. He was a recipient of the Knight's Cross of the Iron Cross of Nazi Germany.

Awards
 Iron Cross (1914) 2nd Class (1915)
 Clasp to the Iron Cross (1939)
 2nd Class (17 December 1941)
 Iron Cross (1939)
 1st Class (5 September 1943)
 Silesian Eagle 2nd Class (10 October 1919)
 Honour Cross of the World War 1914/1918 (30 January 1935)
 Wehrmacht Long Service Award 4th to 1st Class (15 September 1939)
 War Merit Cross 2nd Class with Swords (30 January 1941) & 1st Class (20 April 1942)
 Minesweeper War Badge (6 December 1941)
 German Cross in Gold on 9 November 1944 as Konteradmiral and Befehlshaber der Sicherung der Nordsee (Commander-in-Chief of the security of the North Sea)
 Knight's Cross of the Iron Cross on 17 January 1945 as Konteradmiral and Befehlshaber der Sicherung der Nordsee
 Merit Cross 1st Class of the Federal Republic of Germany (April 1967)

References

Citations

Bibliography

 
 
 
 

1896 births
1975 deaths
People from Nordfriesland
People from the Province of Schleswig-Holstein
Counter admirals of the Kriegsmarine
Recipients of the Gold German Cross
Recipients of the clasp to the Iron Cross, 1st class
Recipients of the Knight's Cross of the Iron Cross
Officers Crosses of the Order of Merit of the Federal Republic of Germany
Imperial German Navy personnel of World War I
Reichsmarine personnel
20th-century Freikorps personnel
Military personnel from Schleswig-Holstein